National Highway 59 (NH 59) is a National Highway in India connecting Khariar and Brahmapur in the state of Odisha. Before renumbering of national highways, route of NH-59 was part of old national highway 217. The Highway is connected with SH 42 of Odisha State near Bangomunda.

Route
NH59 links Khariar, Titlagarh, Lankagarh, Baligurha, Surada, Asika, Hinjilicut and Brahmapur in the state of Odisha.

Junctions  

  Terminal near Khariar.
  near Belgaon
  near Asika
  near Asika
  Terminal near Brahmapur.

See also 
 List of National Highways in India
 List of National Highways in India by state

References

External links 

 NH 59 on OpenStreetMap

National highways in India
National Highways in Odisha